Temple Neuf may refer to:

 Temple Neuf, Metz
 Temple Neuf, Strasbourg